Knesset elections were held in Israel on 30 June 1981. The ruling Likud won one more seat than the opposition Alignment, in line with many polls which had predicted a tight race. Voter turnout was 78.5%, with Likud receiving around ten thousand more than the Alignment. This elections highlighted the polarization in the country.

Background
Prior to the elections, Menachem Begin's government faced instability due to internal conflict amongst coalition partners and international pressures, as well as issues with corruption, and failure to pass legislation. Discontent with the government was growing, and 40% of people agreed that "the major problems facing the state and the entire political system must be changed and a strong government of leaders and independent of parties should take control".

Parliament factions

The table below lists the parliamentary factions represented in the 9th Knesset.

Electoral system
The 120 seats in the Knesset were elected by closed list proportional representation, with seats allocated using the D'Hondt method. This led to numerous parties winning seats and multi-party government coalitions.

Campaign
Since 1965 parties had begun abandoning attempts to frame moral issues in favor of spreading wider nets to catch a bigger range of voters. Rather than focusing on controversial issues that divided them, parties took to forming clusters that resorted to "emotive catchwords" and the lowest common denominator. The party clusters had set aside fundamental ideals in order to work together, which meant that infighting amongst the coalitions was inevitable.

Menachem Begin, Likud's most popular candidate, served as a strong factor for the party's resurgence. 41% of the adult Jews responded in favor of seeing Begin as prime minister, with 49% saying Begin would better be able to deal with the country’s problems. The Alignment, whose announcement of potential major ministerial appointments failed to include Yitzhak Rabin, left the impression of a power-hungry group of politicians, with animosity between party leaders Shimon Peres and Rabin.

Public perception of the parties became instrumental in the elections; throughout the campaign the Alignment was seen and painted as the establishment party, considered by 48% of Israeli citizens surveyed to be more old-fashioned, despite its opposition to the government for the four years prior. The Alignment was also seen as self-interested by rather than interested in the good of the people, as well as corrupt. Likud, meanwhile, was seen as slightly stronger (50% as compared with the Alignment's 44%), more honest (57%), and more concerned with the fate of the citizens than that of the party (45%). Likud was able to benefit from having only been created 8 years prior, giving it an image of newness and innocence.

The 1981 elections also saw a rise in the use of ethnic ideas within the political discourse. While Likud and the Alignment were both led by Ashkenazi politicians, the Alignment was considered the party of the Ashkenazi Jews, with the Sephardic vote lost to  Likud. The likelihood of Sephardim voting for Likud and Ashkenazim voting for the Alignment was more pronounced than ever before. However, Likud enjoyed the advantage of still being able to appeal to a significant amount of Ashkenazi voters, while also maintaining their Sephardi popularity; in contrast, the Alignment was seen as even less Sephardi than in previous years.

Conduct
Police noted before election day that "there hasn’t been an election campaign in Israel as violent as the present one". A reason for the violence may have been that this was the first elections in which the public believed both sides had a chance of winning, causing unrest and agitation.

Results
Scholars attribute the Likud's comeback, from its lowest point six months prior to the 1981 legislative election, to five main factors: incumbency, candidates, images, campaigns, violence, and ethnicity. Likud's role as the ruling party enabled the party to use its incumbency advantage to increase popularity with policy implementation. The party implemented tax programs that lowered prices for consumers, subsidized oil products at a higher rate than ever before, and used foreign policy that made the Alignment seem unpatriotic if they argued against the moves.

Aftermath
Menachim Begin (of the Likud) became Prime Minister and in August 1981 included the National Religious Party, Agudat Yisrael, the Movement for the Heritage of Israel (Tami) and Tehiya in his coalition to form the nineteenth government. After Begin resigned due to health reasons, Yitzhak Shamir formed the twentieth government in October 1983, with the same coalition parties.

During the Knesset term, two MKs defected from Likud to the Alignment. Haim Drukman left the National Religious Party and sat as an independent MK, whilst two other MKs left the National Religious Party and formed Gesher – Zionist Religious Centre before returning two weeks later. Telem split into Ometz and the Movement for the Renewal of Social Zionism, whilst Ratz joined the Alignment but then broke away again.

See also
1980 Israeli Labor Party leadership election

References

External links
Historical overview of the Tenth Knesset Knesset website
Factional and Government Make-Up of the Tenth Knesset Knesset website

Israeli legislative
Legislative election
Legislative elections in Israel
June 1981 events in Asia
Israel